Skull and Bones is an upcoming action-adventure video game developed by Ubisoft Singapore and published by Ubisoft. The game is set to release during the 2023–2024 fiscal year for Amazon Luna, Microsoft Windows, PlayStation 5 and Xbox Series X/S. A version for Google Stadia was planned before the service's shutdown. The game revolves around piracy and naval warfare.

Gameplay 
Skull and Bones is a tactical action game set in an open world environment and played from a third-person perspective. Players take control of a customizable pirate ship, and may choose to sail the Indian Ocean by themselves and set off on a single-player campaign, or gather up to five other players to ally in player versus player gameplay in Disputed Waters.

Wind positioning can be assessed to gain an advantage in battle. Players may collect additional ships throughout the game, such as sloops-of-war, frigates and brigantines, whose weapons include mortars, broadside cannons, and rockets. Ships can be charged into with brute force and boarded. The rate of inflicted damage is gauged by the health bar. A core component is the multiplayer mode Loot Hunt, where two groups of players are challenged in treasure hunting to further accumulate their riches. Each given ship's crow's nest is scalable for use as a lookout point and spyglasses can be availed of as well. Microtransactions will be included.

Development and release
Skull and Bones is the first video game led by developer Ubisoft Singapore, which drew inspiration from the naval battles of Assassin's Creed IV: Black Flag.  The game began development in 2013, being initially envisioned as an expansion of Assassin's Creed IV: Black Flag, then an MMO spinoff title under the name Black Flag Infinite. It was then spun off as an independent project, in part due to its initial technology becoming outdated.

According to a Kotaku report, the game has undergone multiple changes in direction and scope during development, exceeding its budget multiple times. Initially set in the Caribbean, it was moved to the fantastical Hyperborea, then finally the Indian Ocean. Gameplay was redesigned multiple times, focusing variously on naval exploration and ship-to-ship combat, before both were scrapped in favour of land-based survival elements inspired by games like Rust. Developers contacted by journalist Ethan Gach attributed these difficulties to conflicting ideas, management issues, and lack of consistent direction. The project reportedly cost Ubisoft more than $120 million.

It was revealed during Ubisoft's press conference at E3 2017. It was confirmed for Microsoft Windows, PlayStation 4 and Xbox One, with enhancements for PlayStation 4 Pro and Xbox One X. Alongside the game, Ubisoft Singapore announced the "Keepers of the Code" program, designed to allow players to aid in the fine-tuning of its live-service aspects.

Originally set to be released in Q3/Q4 2018, the game was later delayed into 2019, and again to sometime after March 2020.  On a call with investors in October 2019, Ubisoft CEO Yves Guillemot confirmed that the game had been pushed back to at least the April 2021–March 2022 fiscal year.

In September 2020, it was revealed that, while development was continuing, a "new vision" for the game had emerged, which resulted in the release delays as more development time was needed. As well, it was stated that additional Ubisoft Studios, such as Ubisoft Berlin, were co-developing the game alongside Ubisoft Singapore.

In May 2021, Ubisoft announced a subsequent delay to the April 2022–March 2023 fiscal year. In July 2022, the company revealed a November 8 release date for the game. In September 2022, Ubisoft announced that the release was pushed back to March 9, 2023. In January 2023, Ubisoft delayed the game to sometime during the 2023–2024 fiscal year due to recent launches underperforming. Although they released new footage for the game, Ubisoft has yet to announce a new release date.

Awards
Following E3 2017, Skull and Bones was nominated for Game Critics Awards' Best Original Game and Best Online Multiplayer awards. It was nominated for Outstanding Animated Character in an Episode or Real-Time Project at the 21st Visual Effects Society Awards.

Adaptation
It was announced in early 2019 that Ubisoft was partnering with Atlas Entertainment to adapt Skull and Bones into a television show. It will be executive produced by Danielle Kreinik, Jason Altman, Andy Horwitz, Richard Suckle and Amanda Segel, who is slated to write the pilot episode.

Notes

References

External links
 

Upcoming video games
Action-adventure games
Cancelled Stadia games
Multiplayer and single-player video games
Naval video games
Open-world video games
Cancelled PlayStation 4 games
PlayStation 5 games
Real-time tactics video games
Ubisoft games
Vaporware video games
Video games about pirates
Video games developed in Singapore
Video games set in the 18th century
Windows games
Cancelled Xbox One games
Xbox Series X and Series S games